Myocyte enhancer binding factor 2B (MEF2B) is a transcription factor part of the MEF2 gene family including MEF2A, MEF2C, and MEF2D. However, MEF2B is distant from the other three branches of MEF2 genes as it lacks the protein-coding Holliday junction recognition protein C-terminal (HJURP_C) region in vertebrates.

Functions 
The MEF2 gene family is expressed in muscle-specific gene activation and maintenance during development. MEF2B mRNA is present in skeletal, smooth, brain and heart muscles. MEF2B is directly involved in smooth muscle myosin heavy chain (SMHC) gene regulation. Overexpression of MEF2B will activate the SMHC promoter in smooth muscle when it is bound to the A/T-rich element of the promoter.

Interactions 

MEF2B has been shown to interact with CABIN1.

Clinical relevance 

Recurrent mutations in this gene have been associated with cases of diffuse large B-cell lymphoma. In its mutated form, MEF2B can lead to deregulation of the proto-oncogene BCL6 expression in diffuse large B-cell lymphomas (DLBCL). Mutations of MEF2B enhance its transcriptional activity due to either a disruption with its corepressor CABIN1 or causing the gene to become insensitive to inhibitory signaling events.

See also 
 Mef2

References

Further reading

External links 
 

Transcription factors